Mount McElroy is a prominent mountain at the west end of the Hutton Mountains, in southeastern Palmer Land, Antarctica. It was discovered by the Ronne Antarctic Research Expedition, 1947–48, led by Finn Ronne, who named the mountain for Theodore Roosevelt McElroy of Boston, who contributed the radio and communication instruments for the expedition.

References

Mountains of Palmer Land